Sir William Slingsby (29 January 1563 – 1634), was an English soldier, who is often erroneously noted as the discoverer of the first spa water well in Harrogate, North Yorkshire.

He was the seventh, but third surviving son of Sir Francis Slingsby and Mary de Percy, daughter of Sir Thomas Percy, executed for his part in the Pilgrimage of Grace, and sister of Thomas Percy, 7th Earl of Northumberland, and Henry Percy, 8th Earl of Northumberland. The Percies were descendants of Saer de Quincy, 1st Earl of Winchester. He was born in Scriven, Knaresborough, West Riding. After marrying Elizabeth Broard, daughter of Sir Stephen Broad of Broadshill, Sussex in 1582, the couple took a Grand Tour of Europe, returning in 1594. In 1596, Slingsby discovered that water from the Tewit Well mineral spring at Harrogate, possessed similar properties to that from Spa, Belgium.

In 1596 Slingsby served as a soldier on the Cadiz expedition, and again in 1597 against Spain.

He purchased the estate of Kippax, West Yorkshire from Francis Bailden. In 1601 he was made the junior Member of Parliament for Knaresborough alongside his brother Sir Henry Slingsby, serving until 1611. He was knighted in 1603. After retiring from soldiering, he was made Deputy Lieutenant for Middlesex in 1617. He was elected MP for Appleby in 1626.

He died in 1634, leaving a son, Henry, who became Master of the Mint, and a daughter, and was buried in Knaresborough church. He had several distinguished nephews, including Sir Henry Slingsby, 1st Baronet, Guildford Slingsby, and Sir Robert Slingsby, 1st Baronet.

His portrait by Moses Griffith hangs in the National Portrait Gallery.

References

History of Parliament SLINGSBY, William (1563–1634) of Kippax, Yorks

1563 births
1634 deaths
People from Knaresborough
English army officers
English landowners
Knights Bachelor
English MPs 1601
English MPs 1604–1611
Deputy Lieutenants of Middlesex
16th-century English soldiers
English MPs 1626